The women's 3000 metres steeplechase event at the 2020 Summer Olympics took place on 1 and 4 August 2021 at the Japan National Stadium. 41 athletes competed.

Summary

Beatrice Chepkoech came in to these Olympics as the World Record holder and World Champion, but she has not seemed as dominant in 2021. 2016 Gold Medalist Ruth Jebet could not return due to a drug suspension for using EPO. Silver medalist Hyvin Kiyeng Jepkemoi and bronze medalist Emma Coburn returned.

In the final, Chepkoech moved to the front off the line, the pack obliged her the lead as they got organized at a slow pace. After a lap, Peruth Chemutai stepped out to lane 2 and cruised from the back of the pack to the front to up the speed. For the next two and a half laps, Kiyeng, Coburn, Chepkoech, Winfred Yavi and Courtney Frerichs jockeyed around behind Chemutai while the rest of the sixteen starters struggled to keep up. Then Frerichs moved to the front, injecting more speed. The group of six broke off the front. Seeing the break, Maruša Mišmaš-Zrimšek almost sprinted to bridge the gap and joining the group. After another lap, Chepkoech struggled and fell off the back. About the same time, Frerichs broke off the front, only Chemutai gave chase. Coming off the water jump with a little more than two laps to go, Frerichs accelerated again, losing Chemutai up to 15 metres behind. After the next water jump, with a little over a lap to go, Chemutai sped up to pull in the gap. She went by Frerichs with authority at the beginning of the backstretch. Frerichs accelerated again to keep contact with Chemutai. Chemutai took the final water jump cleanly, Frerichs got hung up in the water and the break was made. 
Chemutai cruised home with a 20 metre margin, holding up her number one finger to celebrate Uganda's first victory in the Steeplechase and the first Ugandan woman to take gold. Frerichs lost her momentum and struggled home the final straightaway but still had enough of a margin on a fast closing Kiyeng to take silver.

Background

This will be the 4th appearance of the event, having appeared at every Olympics since 2008.

Qualification

A National Olympic Committee (NOC) could enter up to 3 qualified athletes in the women's 3000 metres steeplechase event if all athletes meet the entry standard or qualify by ranking during the qualifying period. (The limit of 3 has been in place since the 1930 Olympic Congress.) The qualifying standard is 9:30.00. This standard was "set for the sole purpose of qualifying athletes with exceptional performances unable to qualify through the IAAF World Rankings pathway." The world rankings, based on the average of the best five results for the athlete over the qualifying period and weighted by the importance of the meet, will then be used to qualify athletes until the cap of 45 is reached.

The qualifying period was originally from 1 May 2019 to 29 June 2020. Due to the COVID-19 pandemic, the period was suspended from 6 April 2020 to 30 November 2020, with the end date extended to 29 June 2021. The world rankings period start date was also changed from 1 May 2019 to 30 June 2020; athletes who had met the qualifying standard during that time were still qualified, but those using world rankings would not be able to count performances during that time. The qualifying time standards could be obtained in various meets during the given period that have the approval of the IAAF. Both indoor and outdoor meets are eligible. The most recent Area Championships may be counted in the ranking, even if not during the qualifying period.

NOCs cannot use their universality place in the 3000 metres steeplechase.

Competition format

The event will continue to use the two-round format introduced in 2012.

Records

Prior to this competition, the existing world, Olympic, and area records are as follows.

The following national records were established during the competition:

Schedule

All times are Japan Standard Time (UTC+9)

The women's 3000 metres steeplechase will take place over two separate days.

Results

Round 1
Qualification rule: First 3 in each heat (Q) and the next 6 fastest (q) advance to the Final.

Heat 1

Heat 2

Heat 3

Final

References

Women's 3000 metres steeplechase
2020
Women's events at the 2020 Summer Olympics
Olympics